Joseph H. O'Donnell, Jr. (May 22, 1925 – December 12, 2005) was the Lieutenant Governor of the U.S. state of Rhode Island from 1967 to 1969. He was a Republican. From 1963 to 1966, he was the Rhode Island State Director of Administration.

He is the only Republican elected lieutenant governor of Rhode Island since 1940, though Bernard Jackvony was later appointed to fill a vacancy.

References

1925 births
2005 deaths
Lieutenant Governors of Rhode Island
20th-century American politicians